The Perkins family of Ufton Nervet in the English county of Berkshire were a prominent Roman Catholic family in Protestant England. From 1581 until 1769, a span covering seven generations of the Perkins family, they lived at Ufton Court in the parish.

The last member of the family was John Perkins (d. 1769); on his death, due to an entail made by his brother Francis, the estate passed to John Jones, of Llanarth, and then to William Congreve, of Aldermaston, a relation of the famous dramatist of that name.

Arabella Fermor (1696-1737), who married Francis Perkins of Ufton Court (d. 1736), was the inspiration for Alexander Pope's poem The Rape of the Lock.

The Roman Catholic martyr, later sainted, Swithun Wells was a relation of the Perkins family; when interrogated in 1587, Wells stated that he had lived for three months at Ufton Court, then in possession of his nephew Francis Perkins; as a recusant, Perkins was fined the statutory £20 a month for failing to attend the parish church, and had to rent Ufton to his cousin Thomas Perkins to pay the heavy fines. The house- which was raided by the authorities on at least two occasions- today retains signs of the family's secret adherence to their faith, including a chapel in the rafters, hiding places for priests, and an escape tunnel through woodland.

References

English families
People from Ufton Nervet
English gentry families